Znojile pri Čepljah (in older sources Snojle) is a former village in central Slovenia in the Municipality of Lukovica. It is now part of the village of Čeplje. It is part of the traditional region of Upper Carniola and is now included in the Central Slovenia Statistical Region.

Geography
Znojile pri Čepljah stands on a dolomite ridge northeast of Lukovica pri Domžalah.

Name
The name Znojile is derived from *znoji(d)lo 'sunny or sun-facing area' from the verb *znojiti 'to be warmed by the sun'. The name therefore refers to the geographical orientation of the place.

History
According to oral tradition, French soldiers from the French administration at the beginning of the 19th century are buried below Znojile pri Čepljah and the neighboring hamlet of Gorišek (a.k.a. Goriškovo). The bunker was supplied by the nearby farm known as Pri treh sestrah (At the Three Sisters), and Milan Cunder (1908–1970) was one of the physicians that treated patients at the bunker.

Znojile pri Čepljah had a population of 20 (in three houses) in 1880, and 19 (in three houses) in 1900. Znojile pri Čepljah was annexed by Čeplje in 1955, ending its existence as a separate settlement.

References

External links
Znojile pri Čepljah on Geopedia

Populated places in the Municipality of Lukovica
Former settlements in Slovenia